"Chasing Colors" is a song by American DJs and Marshmello and Ookay featuring American singer Noah Cyrus. It was written and produced by the former two with additional writing credits going to Skyler Stonestree and Chase Duddy and released on 24 February 2017 via Marshmello's label Joytime Collective.

Background
The song was previously leaked by fans on SoundCloud, YouTube and Reddit as a WAV file. It featured the vocals of the song's co-writer, Skyler Stonestreet, and was previously dubbed "Living High". Marshmello said via his Facebook page that the track's release was actually brought forward due to the track leaking online. He stated: "When you leak an artists unreleased music you mess up all plans for that song. It's really not cool and is the reason why we decided to change things up."

Composition
It features a 'cacophony of vocaloids' and big room synths alongside Cyrus' vocals.

Charts

Weekly charts

Year-end charts

References

2017 singles
Marshmello songs
Ookay songs
Noah Cyrus songs
2017 songs
Songs written by Skyler Stonestreet
Songs written by Marshmello